Calliostoma sanjaimense is a species of sea snail, a marine gastropod mollusk in the family Calliostomatidae.

Description
The height of the shell attains 10 mm.

Distribution
This marine species occurs off Cocos Island, Costa Rica

References

External links
 To ITIS
 To World Register of Marine Species
 

sanjaimense
Gastropods described in 1970